Sarles is a surname. Notable people with the surname include:

Bob Sarles (born 1957), American filmmaker
Elmore Y. Sarles (1859–1929), American politician
Nathalie Sarles (born 1962), French politician
Roscoe Sarles (1892–1922), American racecar driver
Ruth Sarles Benedict (1906-1996), American journalist
William Bowen Sarles (1906–1987), American microbiologist